Malokurazovo (Bäläkäy Quraz) is a rural locality (a village) in Krasnokholmsky Selsoviet, Kaltasinsky District, Bashkortostan, Russia. The population was 150 as of 2010. There are 5 streets.

Geography 
Malokurazovo is located 21 km northeast of Kaltasy (the district's administrative centre) by road. Bolshekurazovo is the nearest rural locality.

References 

Rural localities in Kaltasinsky District